Şener Özbayraklı (born 23 January 1990) is a Turkish footballer who plays as a right back for İstanbul Başakşehir.

Club career
He made his Süper Lig debut on 19 January 2013. After two successful seasons at Bursaspor it was announced that Bursaspor had accepted a €1,700,000 offer from Fenerbahçe on the 23 June 2015.

Galatasaray
He was transferred to Galatasaray before the 2019-20 season. In the statement sent by Galatasaray Sportif AŞ to the Public Disclosure Platform, it was stated that 2 seasons have been agreed with professional football player Şener Özbayraklı starting from the 2019-20 football season.

Başakşehir
On June 9, 2021, he has signed a two-year contract with İstanbul Başakşehir.

International career
He was part of the Turkish national team for Euro 2016.

Career statistics

Club

International

Personal life
In February 2020, the actress got engaged to Şilan Makal. The couple got married in May 2020.

References

External links
 
 
 
 
 
 

1990 births
Living people
People from Borçka
Turkish footballers
Association football fullbacks
Turkey international footballers
Turkey B international footballers
Turkey youth international footballers
Süper Lig players
Bursaspor footballers
Fenerbahçe S.K. footballers
Galatasaray S.K. footballers
UEFA Euro 2016 players
Association football defenders